The 2010 Enfield Council election took place on 6 May 2010 to elect members of Enfield London Borough Council in London, England. The whole council was up for election and the Labour party gained overall control of the council from the Conservative party.

Background
The last election in 2006 had the Conservatives hold a majority with 34 seats, compared to 27 for Labour and 2 from the Save Chase Farm group. Between 2006 and 2010 Labour gained a seat from the Conservatives in February 2009 at a by-election in Jubilee ward, but a Labour councillor Denise Headley defected to the Conservatives in August 2009.

11 councillors stood down at the election, 7 Conservatives and 4 Labour, including the leader of the Labour group Jeff Rodin. Parties standing at the election, included the Green party who stood in every ward for the first time, the UK Independence Party who had 5 candidates and the British National Party who had 4.

Election result
Labour gained control with 36 seats after winning all 3 seats in 12 wards, while the Conservatives won 27 seats in 9 wards. Labour dominated the east of the borough, while the Conservatives held the seats in the west. Wards where Labour gained from the Conservatives included Enfield Lock, Palmers Green, Southbury and Turkey Street, but the Conservatives gained 2 seats from Save Chase Farm councillors.

Following the election Doug Taylor became the new Labour leader of the council, after being elected unopposed as the leader of the Labour group.

Ward results

References

2010
2010 London Borough council elections
May 2010 events in the United Kingdom